Hickory Hills is a city in Cook County, Illinois.  Located principally in Palos Township, it is a suburb of Chicago. The population in 2020 was 14,505.

History
The Hickory Hills Country Club was founded in 1917 in the area of the present-day city, with an 18-hole golf course designed by Scottish-American golfer James Foulis.  The club exists to the present day.

The village of Hickory Hills was incorporated in September 1951 from the territory between 91st to 95th streets, and between 80th to 88th avenue.  The village at  the time of incorporation had around 450 residents. Voters approved a change from village to city form of government in October 1966. 

In  1961, the Poor Clares nuns, a branch of the Franciscan order, acquired 20 acres of land at 89th street and Keane avenue with which to establish a new monastery. However, the monastery closed in 1992 due to dwindling numbers.  The order returned to Chicago in 1999, moving to a new monastery in nearby Palos Park in 2003.

Geography
Hickory Hills lies on the relatively hilly Tinley Moraine, a belt of ridges laid down about 14,000 years ago during the Wisconsin glaciation.

Most of present-day Hickory Hills lies in the northern part of Palos Township, excepting those parts north of 87th Street which lie in Lyons Township.  The city's main east-west thoroughfares are 87th Street and 95th Street, the latter carrying U.S. Route 12 and Route 20 across the South Chicago suburbs.  The city is bounded on the east by the Tri-State Tollway (Interstate 294) and on the west by the Palos Forest Preserve, a 15,000 acre nature reserve.  Neighboring communities are Palos Hills, Bridgeview and Justice.

Demographics

The top five ancestries reported in Hickory Hills as of 2020 were Polish (24.7%), Arab (11.5%), Irish (6.8%), Lithuanian (6.7%), and German (5.9%).

There were 4,929 households, out of which 75.37% had children under the age of 18 living with them, 56.04% were married couples living together, 8.76% had a female householder with no husband present, and 28.65% were non-families. 25.42% of all households were made up of individuals, and 10.59% had someone living alone who was 65 years of age or older. The average household size was 3.51 and the average family size was 2.87.

The city's age distribution consisted of 27.2% under the age of 18, 8.0% from 18 to 24, 26.7% from 25 to 44, 24.2% from 45 to 64, and 14.1% who were 65 years of age or older. The median age was 36.9 years. For every 100 females, there were 107.9 males. For every 100 females age 18 and over, there were 113.6 males.

The median income for a household in the city was $66,272, and the median income for a family was $76,417. Males had a median income of $46,541 versus $35,925 for females. The per capita income for the city was $29,712. About 6.9% of families and 9.3% of the population were below the poverty line, including 12.8% of those under age 18 and 8.1% of those age 65 or over.

Government
Hickory Hills is in Illinois's 3rd congressional district.

Education
Elementary school districts serving Hickory Hills include:
North Palos School District 117
Indian Springs District 109
Amos Alonzo Stagg High School of Consolidated High School District 230 - Students in the District 117 zone attend Stagg
Argo Community High School - Students in the District 109 zone attend Argo

St. Patricia School, a private school, is in the area.

Hickory Hills is home to a satellite campus of Lewis University located near 95th street and Roberts Road.

Infrastructure
The North Palos Fire Protection District serves the community.

Notable people
 James Hickey, (born 1960), United States Army soldier notable for his leadership role in Operation Red Dawn, the military effort that captured Saddam Hussein. He was raised in Hickory Hills.
 Marty Casey (born 1973), rock musician
 Max Strus (born 1996), professional basketball player.

Notes

References

External links

City of Hickory Hills official website

Cities in Illinois
Chicago metropolitan area
Cities in Cook County, Illinois
Populated places established in 1951
1951 establishments in Illinois